Andrew Colville is an American screenwriter.

He has worked on the AMC drama Mad Men, for which he won a Writers Guild of America (WGA) Award. Following that he was a writer on the critically acclaimed but short-lived Fox TV series Lone Star.   After the cancellation of Lone Star, he became a writer and co-producer on the first season of The CW action series Nikita (2010–11), and served as a writer/producer in its second season (2011–12).  He then became a writer/producer on the first season of the USA Network series Graceland in 2013.  He was also a writer and executive producer on the AMC drama series Turn: Washington's Spies, a fictionalized account of the Culper Spy Ring masterminded by General George Washington during the American Revolutionary War.

Biography
Colville joined the crew of AMC drama Mad Men for the third season in 2009. He co-wrote the episode "The Arrangements" with series creator and show runner Matthew Weiner. Colville and the writing staff won the Writers Guild of America (WGA) Award for Best Drama Series at the February 2010 ceremony for their work on the third season.

Colville is from Louisville, Kentucky.

References

External links

American male screenwriters
American television writers
Deep Springs College alumni
Living people
Year of birth missing (living people)
American male television writers